Vinoviloth are one of the tribes in Scandza (Scandinavia) mentioned by Jordanes in De origine actibusque Getarum in the 6th century CE. It has been suggested that they would have been the same as the Winnili. Sometimes Vingulmark is also mentioned. Jordanes writes:
And there are beyond these the Ostrogoths, Raumarici, Aeragnaricii, and the most gentle Finns, milder than all the inhabitants of Scandza. Like them are the Vinovilith  also.
Besides De origine, the Vinoviloth are not mentioned anywhere else.

Alfred Anscombe proposes that the Vinoviloth were Goths settled in Britain at Vinovia. These would be the Goths mentioned by Asser as ancestors of Alfred the Great. The second element of their name would be related to Old English loða, cloak, which Anscombe sees as the second element in the name Lancelot. These names, in his view, have a parallel development because Lancelot can be associated with Binchester (Vinovia).

See also
List of Germanic tribes

References

Early Germanic peoples
Lombards
North Germanic tribes